Ivo Ivaniš (14 February 1976 – 16 August 2003) was a Croatian water polo player. He competed in the men's tournament at the 2000 Summer Olympics.

References

1976 births
2003 deaths
People from Konavle
Croatian male water polo players
Olympic water polo players of Croatia
Water polo players at the 2000 Summer Olympics